Mr. Chandramouli is a 2018 Indian Tamil-language sports comedy thriller film written and directed by Thiru and produced by G. Dhananjayan. It stars Karthik, his son Gautham Karthik, Regina Cassandra, Varalaxmi Sarathkumar, and Santhosh Prathap. The film revolves around Raghav, a professional boxer, finds himself in a fix when an unexpected turn of events gets him tangled in a battle between his passion, family and the love of his life.

Plot 

The movie starts with Raghav, the son of Chandramouli, waking up severely injured in a hospital. The following scenes are set in a flashback that happened several weeks ago.

Azhagar, the CEO of an online taxi company, wins the award for the seventh consecutive year for his company being the leading one in the industry. Vinayak Kanakasabai, the CEO of his rival company, GoCabs, also attends the awarding ceremony. He approaches Azhagar to deliver his admiration to him and also challenges him that GoCabs will take over the position of Azhagar's company next year. Feeling threatened, Azhagar orders his assistant Pugazhendhi to do something to stop GoCabs from overtaking his company's place by saying that his fame will be ruined if he is defeated by someone much younger than him (Vinayak). In order to defame GoCabs, Pugazhendhi then hires many wanted suspects to commit crimes in GoCabs taxis as drivers. His plan works in the initial days after several news of GoCabs drivers committing crimes to go viral. Some people in Chennai are even doubting the safety of GoCabs taxis; moreover, some police officers are also investigating Vinayak's responsibility in the cases, and authorities are also filing a lawsuit against Vinayak.

Meanwhile, Raghav was a brilliant boxer that lived with his father Chandramouli, who had special emotion to old things: his car, which he names Padmini, has been used for longer than 20 years that cannot even start sometimes; and a phone that is only available for phone calls and SMS. People around him always tried to persuade him to buy a new car that works well and change his phone to a new model that he can use Facebook and WhatsApp with. He rejected them all, insisting that he will use the old things to the very end. Raghav was trying to get a sponsorship from Vinayak for a major boxing fight, but the latter rejected him. Raghav then approached Azhagar and got his sponsorship. With that sponsorship, Raghav won the race and gave the award - a new car - to his father. Chandramouli was moved by his son's gift and invited him out for a drive at midnight. During the drive, their car was run over by a truck, which killed Chandramouli and severely injured Raghav.

That was all that happened before the first scene of the movie - Raghav waking up in a hospital. He soon learns that his father died in the accident and that his nervous system is also incurably injured, making him no longer able to see things more than two feet away. By then, he still believes that what changed his life was an accident, until several days later, a stranger approaches his house.

The stranger is an officer carrying the death certificate of a woman named Bairavi to ask for Chandramouli's signature. As Chandramouli is no more and Raghav, his girlfriend Madhu, and his friend Padmani do not know who Bairavi is, they tell the officer that he came to the wrong place. Still, the officer insists that Chandramouli is the one he is looking for, and he has other papers with Chandramouli's signature. Raghav reviews the papers and confirms that the signature is indeed his father's. In contrast, the papers show that his father is the one who hosted Bairavi's funeral just a few days before his own death because he was the only connected person of Bairavi.

They decide to discover his father's untold story, so they approach Chandramouli's close friend Ramamurthy, who later tells them the shocking story. Bairavi, a single woman with no children or parents, was Chandramouli's friend. They got to know each other not long ago when she was trying to buy his car at a high price because the car reminds her of her deceased father, who had the same car. She was also the one that helped Raghav get Azhagar's sponsorship because she was the financial manager of Azhagar's company. Bairavi was recently killed by a GoCabs driver, similar to other GoCabs cases. Still, shortly after her death, Chandramouli told Ramamurthy that Bairavi was not killed by the driver, but by someone else he knew. He asked Ramamurthy's help to reveal the truth, so Ramamurthy took him to a senior police officer to report it. The officer, however, warned him not to get involved in this case, because many big shots are behind it. Chandramouli is seen confused on the night of the same day where he asks Raghav for a drive at 3:00 AM, and that was when he was killed.

Raghav then finds the driver's name from the FIR copy and confronts him, who tells him that it was a mistake as he lost control over the vehicle. Still, he is later caught red-handed by Raghav as he overhears the driver speaking to Pugazhendhi about Raghav's confrontation. Raghav chases him only to find him hanging dead in an isolated factory. Later, Padmani informs him about Bairavi's phone found in Chandramouli's car, which has pieces of evidence of Bairavi's murder. To find out who the murderer is, Raghav plots to trap the next murderer from GoCabs and sends Madhu and her colleagues in GoCabs. Everybody reaches safe except Madhu, who alerts Raghav when the cab driver stops the car in a remote area. He comes at the right time and catches the driver, who confesses that he was instructed by Pugazhendhi to do so. Raghav finds Pugazhendhi in a bar and chases him, but he escapes. The next day, he is found dead after he uploads a video of his confession about the murders, blaming Azhagar in social media. Raghav then visits Vinayak, who acts naive but is the real culprit, which was found by Raghav on the same day when he chased the lorry driver as he sees Vinayak's reflection in a mirror. Raghav fights with Vinayak and finally burns him to death. The next day, all news channels reportedly telecast the news saying that Vinayak had escaped, no one knows his whereabouts, and police are in search of him.

Finally, Raghav is seen smiling happily in Chandramouli's restored car.

Cast

Production 
In early October 2017, director Thiru announced that he would be making a film starring Karthik and his son Gautham Karthik. Produced by G. Dhananjayan, Thiru revealed that the film would be an action thriller where Karthik would portray a government official and Gautham would portray a boxer. Regina Cassandra and Varalaxmi Sarathkumar were signed to portray the lead female roles, while Sathish was cast in a further supporting role. Thiru also cast veteran directors, Mahendran and Agathiyan in pivotal acting roles, with the latter being the director's father-in-law.

After a period of deliberate suspense, the team announced that the film would be titled Mr. Chandramouli. The film's title is borrowed from a dialogue spoken by Karthik in Mouna Ragam (1986). Production began in late November 2017, and continued throughout early 2018.

Regina Cassandra dubbed for the first time for her role in this film.

Soundtrack 

The soundtrack album of Mr. Chandramouli consists of 6 songs composed by Sam CS and was released on Sony Music on 25 April 2018. The title track was co-sung by actor Sivakumar's daughter Brindha, who made her playback singing debut with this film.

Release 
Mr. Chandramouli released on 6 July 2018.

References

External links 
 

Films directed by Thiru (director)
2010s Tamil-language films
Indian comedy thriller films
2018 films
Indian boxing films
2010s sports films
2018 action thriller films
Films scored by Sam C. S.